Aphelia icteratana is a species of moth of the family Tortricidae. It is found in Turkey.

References

Moths described in 1880
Aphelia (moth)
Moths of Asia